...denn die Musik und die Liebe in Tirol is a 1963 West German musical comedy film directed by Werner Jacobs and starring Vivi Bach, Claus Biederstaedt and Hannelore Auer.

Cast
 Vivi Bach - Susanne Berger
 Claus Biederstaedt - Fred
 Hannelore Auer ...  Monika
 Gunther Philipp ...  Herbert Petunius - Unterhaltungsboß vom Fernsehen
 Corny Collins - Heidi
 Trude Herr - Rehlein
 Hubert von Meyerinck - Oskar Ortshaus
 Gus Backus - Peter
 Franz Muxeneder - Krummblick
 Hugo Lindinger - Narbe
 Gerd Vespermann - Paul
 Inge Kuntschnigg - Renate
 Aliha Krause - Gertie
 Marie France - Yvonne
 Elke Sommer
 Peppino Di Capri

External links

1963 films
1963 musical comedy films
German musical comedy films
West German films
1960s German-language films
Films directed by Werner Jacobs
1960s German films